A letter D with stroke (Đ, đ) is the letter formed from the base character D/d overlaid with a crossbar, used in some South Slavic (e.g. Serbo-Croatian), Vietnamese, Moro, and Sámi languages.

D with stroke may also refer to:
 Eth (Ð, ð), used in Icelandic, Faroese, and Old English
 African D (Ɖ, ɖ), representing a voiced retroflex plosive sound

Other uses:
 Dogecoin, which uses capital eth (Ð) as its currency symbol
 In chemistry, dispersity is represented by the symbol Ð

Latin letters with diacritics